Muay Thai at the 2005 Southeast Asian Games took place in the Government Service Insurance System Assembly Hall in Pasay, Metro Manila, Philippines.

The event was held from December 1–4.

Medal table

Medalists

Wai Kru

Combat

External links
 Southeast Asian Games Official Results
 Muay Thai 

2005 Southeast Asian Games events
2005